Get Wise to Yourself is the third studio album released by blues guitarist Guitar Shorty. The album was recorded during August and September 1995 and released later that year on CD by the label Black Top. The tracks "I'm the Clean up Man" and "Hard to Stay Above the Ground" appeared on Shorty's compilation album, The Best of Guitar Shorty, in 2006.

Track listing 
"I'm the Clean up Man" (Kearney, Scott) — 3:46
"You Better Get Wise to Yourself" (Jones, Swamp Dogg) — 5:32
"I Don't Know Why" (Mitchell, Randle) — 5:29
"You Don't Treat Me Right" (Kearney) — 2:45
"My Baby Loves to Do the Bump" (Kearney) — 4:25
"Hard to Stay Above the Ground" (Kearney, Scott) — 5:41
"You Left Me Dreaming" (Kazanoff, Kearney, Scott, Zeno) — 4:26
"She's Built, She's Built to Kill" (Swamp Dogg) — 3:42
"A Fool Who Wants to Stay" (Kazanoff) — 4:10
"The Blues Done Got Me" (Kearney) — 5:33
"Ways of Man" (Reynolds, Tate) — 3:34
"Smells Good" (Kearney) — 6:43

Personnel
 Sammy Berfect — organ (hammond)
 Ernest Youngblood, Jr. — saxophone (tenor)
 Guitar Shorty — guitar, vocals
 Mark "Kaz" Kazanoff — saxophone (baritone, tenor), associate producer
 Raymond Weber — percussion, drums
 Riley Osborne — piano
 Charles Elam III, Phillip Manuel — vocals (background)
 Steve Howard — trumpet, flugelhorn
 Mark Mullins — trombone
 Ward Smith — saxophone (alto, baritone, tenor)
 Lee Allen Zeno — bass, associate producer

Production:
 Matt Coby, Jay Gallagher — assistant engineers
 David Farrell, Steve Reynolds — engineers, editing, mixing, sequencing
 Patricia Gorman, Lisa Labo — production assistants
 Rick Olivier — photography
 Hammond Scott — producer, editing, mixing, sequencing
 Nauman S. Scott — executive producer
 Diane Wanek — design
 Heather West — production coordination

Reception 

While the most of AllMusic review of the album makes more mention of Shorty's live show, it does praise the album, saying that it "is one of his best recorded efforts ... that shows his abilities off in the best light."

References 

1995 albums
Guitar Shorty albums